St Cadwaladr's Church is a Grade I listed church in Llangadwaladr, Anglesey. The church is built in the perpendicular style. The nave is dated to the 12th to early 13th century and the chancel to the 14th. Considerable additions were later made in the mid 17th century, with the north chapel in 1640 and the south chapel in 1661. In 1856 the church underwent restoration, at which time to south porch was added.

In the newer part of the churchyard, south of the church, are war graves of four British airmen and a Polish airman of World War II.

References

External links
Artworks at St Cadwaladr's Church, Llangadwaladr

12th-century church buildings in Wales
13th-century church buildings in Wales
14th-century church buildings in Wales
Church in Wales church buildings
Grade I listed churches in Anglesey